The Workers Cup is a 2017 documentary film. It depicts the migrant construction workers in Qatar preparing for the 2022 FIFA World Cup.

References

External links
The Workers Cup (2017) - IMDb
The Workers Cup Film

2017 documentary films
2022 FIFA World Cup
Films set in Qatar
Films shot in Qatar